Barnaul Gherman Titov International Airport  (sometimes referred to as Barnaul West or Mikhaylovka) is a major airport in Altai Krai, Russia located 17 km west of Barnaul. It contains large facilities and a remote tarmac for military use. The airport services airliners and helicopters of all sizes, including planes as large as the Boeing 747, and the Il-96.

Barnaul Airport is named after Soviet cosmonaut Gherman Titov, an Altai Krai native who was the second human being (after Yuri Gagarin) to visit outer space.

History
 The first airport in this location was built in 1937 as a base for Soviet Po-2 biplanes.
 On 12 March 1967, a new modern airport complex was opened with a  runway, taxiways, an apron, hotel, and office space. That same year, direct flights to Moscow began.
 In 1995, the airport officially became an international airport.
 On 26 June 2008, a new arrivals area was opened with a capacity of 500 people per hour.
 On May 27, 2010, the Altai Krai Legislative Assembly officially named the airport after Gherman Titov.

A new  international area and runway extension are planned, which will allow the airport to receive all types of aircraft without restrictions.

Passenger Statistics

Airlines and destinations

The following airlines operate regular scheduled and charter flights at Barnaul Airport:

Transport links
The airport can be reached from Barnaul by marshrutka number 144 and by bus number 110.

See also
Novokuznetsk Spichenkovo Airport (located in Kemerovo Oblast  from Barnaul)

References

Barnaul Airport at Russian Airports Database

External links

Barnaul Airport Official Website
Great Circle Mapper: BAX / UNBB - Barnaul, Barnaul, Russian Federation (Russia)
 ASN Accident history for UNBB
 NOAA/NWS current weather observations

Soviet Air Force bases
Airports built in the Soviet Union
Airports in Altai Krai
Barnaul
Novaport